HCMC or Ho Chi Minh City is the largest city in Vietnam.

HCMC may also refer to:
 Hellenic Capital Market Commission, a financial regulator in Greece
 Hennepin County Medical Center, a hospital in Minneapolis, Minnesota
 Cabudwaak Airport's ICAO code